The A368 is a part primary status A road in North Somerset, England. It runs from Marksbury (near Bath) to Banwell (near Weston-super-Mare) along the northern edge of the Mendip Hills and past the reservoir at Chew Valley Lake. 

The road runs through the village of Chelwood, where there is a roundabout for the junction with the A37, then via the village of Bishop Sutton to the large reservoir at Chew Valley Lake before crossing the B3114 at West Harptree. It then runs via Compton Martin to another smaller reservoir at Blagdon Lake. At Burrington, there is a turning for the B3134 which leads through Burrington Combe. The road crosses the A38 at traffic lights just west of Churchill, and goes through Sandford before ending at Banwell on the A371.

External links

Society of British Road Enthusiasts – Roads by Ten – A368

Roads in England
Roads in Somerset